, son of Uchisane, was a kugyō or Japanese court noble of the Kamakura period (1185–1333). He held a regent position kampaku from 1318 to 1323. Tsunemichi was his son.

Family
 Father: Ichijo Uchisane
 Mother: daughter of Ichijo Sanetsune
 Wife: daughter of Saionji Kin’aki
 Son: Ichijo Tsunemichi by daughter of Saionji Kin’aki

References
 

1291 births
1325 deaths
Fujiwara clan
Ichijō family
People of Kamakura-period Japan